The Zlín XIII was a fast single or two seat aircraft, designed and built in Czechoslovakia in the late 1930s. Its development was ended by the disruption of Czechoslovakia in the approach to World War II.

Design and development

The Zlín XIII was a very aerodynamically clean, low-powered, all wood monoplane with a one-piece, low set, tapered wing equipped with flaps. It was powered by a  Walter Minor four cylinder inverted engine, driving a two blade propeller and with a fixed, faired tailwheel undercarriage. The enclosed cockpit placed the pilot well behind the wing trailing edge with a passenger seat ahead of him; a change of canopy to a shorter version, together with a forward fairing, removed the forward seat. This versatility was intended to allow the type XIII to operate as either a high speed executive transport or as a single seat competition aircraft.

The Zlín XIII was displayed as a two seater at the 10th Prague Aero Show in July 1937, having made its first flight earlier in the year.  It was entered into the French Circuit de l'Est race, but arrived late too late to compete. The German annexation of the Sudetenland in 1938, and the subsequent fragmentation of Czechoslovakia ended development and prevented production, so only the prototype was built.

Aircraft on display
 National Technical Museum (Prague);OK-TBZ, the sole Zlín XIII, in single seat form.

Specifications

References

1930s Czechoslovakian sport aircraft
XIII
Single-engined tractor aircraft
Low-wing aircraft
Aircraft first flown in 1937